S. Chandran is an Indian politician Member of Legislative Assembly of Tamil Nadu. He was elected from Tiruttani  as an Dravida Munnetra Kazhagam candidate in 2021.

Electoral performance

References 	

Tamil Nadu MLAs 2021–2026
Year of birth missing (living people)
Living people
Dravida Munnetra Kazhagam politicians
People from Tiruvallur district